Mohamed Nasser Naguib is an Egyptian footballer. He currently plays as a centre back for El Dakhleya.

Club career
Naguib started his career with Baladeyet El-Mahalla, then he played for Ittihad El-Shorta, Al-Ahly and El Gouna

International career
He has been called up for Egyptian national team for the CAN 2012 qualifier against Niger on October 10, 2010.

References

External links
 
 

1983 births
Living people
Egyptian footballers
Ittihad El Shorta SC players
Al Ahly SC players
El Gouna FC players
Egyptian Premier League players
People from Gharbia Governorate
Association football defenders
Egypt international footballers